Renate Dodell   (born 7 November 1952 in Seeshaupt) is a German politician, representative of the Christian Social Union of Bavaria.

Education and previous professions 
Renate Dodell majored in economics and geography for teaching in secondary schools at the Ludwig Maximilian University of Munich. In 1977 she passed the second state examination. After three years of working as a teacher and a family break until 1987, she worked self-employed as an accountant until 1994.

Renate Dodell is Roman Catholic, divorced and mother of three children.

Political positions 

She is a member of the Landtag of Bavaria and vice-chairman of the parliamentary group for the Christian Social Union of Bavaria.

Honours and distinction 

On 14 July 2005 Renate Dodell was honoured with the Bavarian Order of Merit.

See also
List of Bavarian Christian Social Union politicians

References

Christian Social Union in Bavaria politicians
1952 births
Living people